The Medieval Academy of America (MAA; spelled Mediaeval until c. 1980) is the largest organization in the United States promoting the field of medieval studies. It was founded in 1925 and is based in Cambridge, Massachusetts. The academy publishes the quarterly journal Speculum, and awards prizes, grants, and fellowships such as the Haskins Medal, which is named for Charles Homer Haskins, one of the academy's founders and its second president.

The academy supports research, publication and teaching in medieval art, archaeology, history, law, literature, music, philosophy, religion, science, social and economic institutions, and all other aspects of the Middle Ages.

The academy was admitted to the American Council of Learned Societies in 1927. It has been affiliated with the American Historical Association since 1989.

The academy maintains a peer-reviewed online database, the Medieval Digital Resources website (MDR).

References

 
Organizations based in Cambridge, Massachusetts
History organizations based in the United States
Organizations established in 1925
Medieval studies research institutes
1925 establishments in Massachusetts